Benjamin Kangau Nenkavu (born 14 June 1993) is a Namibian footballer who plays as a defender for Zambian side Buildcon and the Namibia national football team.

Club career
He signed for Zambian side Buildcon in November 2018.

Career statistics

International career

References

Living people
1993 births
Namibian men's footballers
Namibia international footballers
Association football defenders
United Africa Tigers players
Buildcon F.C. players
Namibian expatriate footballers
Expatriate footballers in Zambia
Namibian expatriate sportspeople in Zambia
Namibia Premier League players
People from Ongwediva